John R. Baylor (born John Robert Baylor; July 27, 1822 – February 6, 1894) was a US Indian agent, publisher and editor, politician, and a senior officer of the Confederate States Army. After being dismissed as Indian agent, he became one of the founding editors of The White Man, a newspaper in North Texas, and a strong critic of Governor Sam Houston.

During the American Civil War, Baylor led Texas Confederate forces into New Mexico, and declared himself the 1st Governor of the Arizona Territory. He was confirmed by Confederate President Jefferson Davis. In an altercation, Baylor killed an editor of a rival newspaper. Davis disapproved of orders Baylor gave to his regiment to exterminate the Apache in his territory, and removed him from office as governor, stripping him of his Texas commission.

Later Baylor recovered, settling in San Antonio. He was elected to state government as a legislator and became a rancher. In 1881 he killed another man in an argument, when he was about 59, but was acquitted at trial. He died years later at his ranch.

Early life
John R. Baylor was born in Paris, Kentucky in 1822, the son of a United States Army surgeon and his wife. He had a brother, George Wythe Baylor, who followed their father into military service, later achieving the rank of colonel. The boys grew up with their family on the various military posts where their father was posted as an assistant surgeon in the Seventh Infantry. Their uncle, R.E.B. Baylor, became an associate judge on the Texas Supreme Court and co-founder of Baylor University. A great-uncle was Col. George R. Baylor, who had served in the American Revolution.

Move to Texas
John Baylor moved to Fayette County, Texas at the age of 18, and made his life there. In 1840 he joined a Texas volunteer army to fight against the Comanche Indians. In 1844 he married Emily Hanna in Marshall, Texas, and the couple had seven sons and three daughters. His brother George also ended up in Texas.

While living as a rancher in Texas Baylor decided to try his hand at politics, and was elected to the Texas state legislature in 1851, serving from 1852 to 1854. In 1853 he was admitted to the bar. He was appointed as the agent to the Comanches in 1855, and held that position until his dismissal in 1857. After his dismissal, he began to travel around the state condemning the Comanches and addressing anti-Indian meetings. During this time he edited an anti-Indian newspaper, The White Man, and organized a vigilante force of around 1,000 men to campaign against the Comanches.

John Baylor was appointed as a US Indian agent in Jack County, serving from 1856 to March 1857, when he was dismissed. He became a critic of Governor Sam Houston, saying he was not doing enough to defend settlers in North Texas from the Comanche and Lipan Apache.

He was elected to the state legislature, and, by 1860, became a co-founding publisher and editor of a local newspaper called The White Man, which advocated the expulsion of Indians from North Texas. Based in Jacksboro, it had the advantage of being in a town that was a stop on the Butterfield Overland Mail Route, and was estimated to reach 1,000 readers.

American Civil War
After Texas's secession from the Union, Baylor was commissioned as a Confederate lieutenant colonel in command of the 2nd Texas Cavalry Regiment (also known as the 2nd Texas Mounted Rifles). His force pushed to the southwest into New Mexico Territory and occupied Fort Bliss.

Governor of Arizona Territory (1861–1862)
Following his victory at the First Battle of Mesilla (July 25, 1861), and the surrender of U.S. forces in the area, Baylor proclaimed himself as the Governor of  Arizona Territory, a region encompassing the southern half of contemporary New Mexico and Arizona. His position was confirmed by the Confederate Congress, and he was promoted to colonel in 1861. On January 18, 1862, the fledgling territory was formally organized by the Confederate States.

Soon, a disagreement over critical articles in the Mesilla Times led to a fight between Baylor and the editor, Robert P. Kelly, whom he killed. Attorney General Marcus H. MacWillie, a member of Baylor's state cabinet, officially pardoned him for the homicide. MacWillie was later rewarded when Baylor orchestrated the former AG's election to the 1st Confederate States Congress.

Baylor became known for ordering his cavalry regiment to exterminate the Apache, with whom the encroaching settlers were in conflict. He issued the following order to his men:

When news of this order reached  Confederate President Jefferson Davis, he relieved Baylor as governor and revoked his commission as colonel.

Davis's March 23, 1863 note to the Secretary of War was:

C.S. House of Representatives (1863–1865)
Baylor later was elected to the 2nd Confederate States Congress, serving from 1863 to 1865, representing Texas. He regained his commission as colonel and was raising a new force to recapture the Arizona Territory when the American Civil War ended two weeks later.

Later life
In the postwar years, Baylor settled in San Antonio, Texas. In 1873, he unsuccessfully campaigned for the Democratic party's nomination for Governor of Texas, losing to Richard Coke.

In 1876, during the height of the Black Hills War, Baylor offered his services to the U.S. Army against the Lakota Sioux.

In 1878, he established a sizable ranch in Uvalde County and prospered, but he continued to be involved in violent confrontations and reputedly killed a man in the early 1880s in a feud over livestock. This killing happened in Uvalde County; the victim was named Gilchrist. Baylor was never charged for the crime.

He died at his ranch on February 6, 1894, aged 71. He was buried in the Church of the Ascension cemetery.

Notes

References
 Allardice, Bruce S., Confederate Colonels, University of Missouri Press, 2008.
 Allardice, Bruce S., More Generals in Gray, Louisiana State University Press, 1995, .
 Katheder, Thomas, The Baylors of Newmarket: The Decline and Fall of a Virginia Planter Family. New York and Bloomington, Ind., 2009.
 Thompson, Jerry Don, Colonel John Robert Baylor: Texas Indian Fighter and Confederate Soldier. Hillsboro, Texas: Hill Junior College Press, 1971.

Further reading

External links

 John R. Baylor at The Political Graveyard

1822 births
1894 deaths
19th-century American politicians
American Civil War prisoners of war
Burials in Texas
Cavalry commanders
Confederate States Army officers
Governors of Arizona Territory
Members of the Confederate House of Representatives from Texas
Democratic Party members of the Texas House of Representatives
Military personnel from Kentucky
People from Paris, Kentucky
People acquitted of murder
People of Texas in the American Civil War